The 2015 Famous Idaho Potato Bowl was a college football bowl game that was played on December 22, 2015 at Albertsons Stadium on the campus of Boise State University in Boise, Idaho. It was one of the 2015–16 bowl games that concluded the 2015 FBS football season. The nineteenth annual Famous Idaho Potato Bowl pitted the Akron Zips of the Mid-American Conference against the Utah State Aggies of the Mountain West Conference. The game started at 1:30 p.m. MST and aired on ESPN.  The game is sponsored by the Idaho Potato Commission.

It is most notable for being the first bowl game victory in school history for Akron.

Teams
The game featured the Akron Zips against the Utah State Aggies.  It was the first overall meeting between the two schools.

Akron Zips

After finishing their regular season 7–5, the Zips accepted their invitation to the game.

This was the fourth bowl game in school history for Akron, and their first since the 2005 Motor City Bowl, where they lost to Memphis 38–31. Previous bowl games are: Grantland Rice Bowl 1968,and the Pioneer Bowl 1976.

Utah State Aggies

After finishing their regular season 6–6, the Aggies accepted their invitation to the game.

This was the Aggies' fourth Famous Idaho Potato Bowl; they had previously lost the 1997 Humanitarian Bowl (said game's inaugural edition) to Cincinnati 35–19, then lost the 2011 Famous Idaho Potato Bowl to Ohio 24–23, and finally won the 2012 Famous Idaho Potato Bowl over Toledo, 41–15.

Game summary

Scoring summary

Source:

Statistics

References

2015–16 NCAA football bowl games
2015
2015 Famous Idaho Potato Bowl
2015 Famous Idaho Potato Bowl
2015 in sports in Idaho
December 2015 sports events in the United States